Leroy Township is one of twelve townships in Audubon County, Iowa, United States. As of the 2010 census, its population was 2,496.

History
Leroy Township was organized in 1873.

Geography
According to the USGS, it contains five cemeteries: Aretas Lodge, Arlington Heights, Luccocks Grove, Maple Grove and Saint Patrick's Catholic Cemetery.

References

External links
 US-Counties.com
 City-Data.com

Townships in Audubon County, Iowa
Townships in Iowa
1873 establishments in Iowa
Populated places established in 1873